The Trout Lake Mudflow was a lahar in the U.S. state of Washington that descended from Mount Adams about 6,000 years ago. The mudflow began as a slope failure high on the southwest flank of Mount Adams where the accumulation zone of the White Salmon and Avalanche glaciers are now located, flowed down tributaries to the White Salmon River, then followed the river valley southward.

The mudflow deposit is poorly sorted, unstratified, not graded, and contains abundant clasts of hydrothermally altered andesite. Veneer deposits, up to several tens of centimeters thick, crop out at scattered localities on hillsides and high terraces in valleys below timberline. Along Cascade Creek, between Salt Creek and the White Salmon River, younger lahars obscure the Trout Lake Mudflow at most localities. No deposits of the Trout Lake Mudflow have been found in the upper narrows of the White Salmon River although it flowed through that reach.

The Trout Lake Mudflow changed the courses of both the White Salmon River and Trout Lake Creek in the Trout Lake lowland. Emplacement of the mudflow dammed Trout Lake Creek to form Trout Lake. The original lake is now a complex of interconnected ponds and marshland. The White Salmon River returned to its former channel incised in bedrock near the distal margin of the Trout Lake lobe. In the upper Trout Lake lowland, the White Salmon River and Trout Lake Creek flow along the margin of the lahar where its surface is slightly convex in the upper Trout Lake lowland; near the confluence they have incised into the lahar. The White Salmon River has dissected the mudflow and underlying alluvium throughout much of the lowland; locally it is incised into  of the basalt of Ice Cave.

References

Lahars
Mount Adams (Washington)
Geology of Washington (state)
Landslides in the United States
Prehistoric volcanic events
Holocene events